KCRO (660 kHz) is a commercial AM radio station in Omaha, Nebraska. KCRO is owned by Hickory Radio and airs a Christian talk and teaching radio format. The studios are located on Burt Street (near North 120th Street and Dodge Road in West Omaha), while the transmitter is located behind Roncalli Catholic High School near Sorensen Parkway in Northwest Omaha.

KCRO operates with 1,000 watts power during daytime hours. Because AM 660 is a clear channel frequency (reserved for 50,000-watt Class A WFAN in New York City), KCRO must greatly reduce power to 54 watts at night to avoid interference. It uses a non-directional antenna at all times.

Programming was additionally heard on 60-watt FM translator station K293CJ at 106.5 MHz. The translator has since been moved to Lincoln, and changed frequencies to 106.7 FM.

Programming
KCRO airs national religious leaders such as Jim Daly, Chuck Swindoll and David Jeremiah as well as local preachers.  On weekends, KCRO 660 airs Southern Gospel music.  KCRO is a brokered time radio station, where hosts pay Hickory Radio for 15 to 30-minute blocks of time, and may use their shows to seek donations to their ministries.  Most hours begin with world and national news from SRN News.

History
The station signed on the air on April 19, 1922, making it among the oldest radio stations in Nebraska.  By the 1930s, it was operating on AM 660 at 500 watts. However, it was originally a daytimer required to go off the air at sunset.  The station's call sign was WAAW and it was owned by the Omaha Grain Exchange, broadcasting agricultural reports and crop prices.  In 1939, the call letters were switched to KOWH.

In 1946, KOWH put one of the first FM stations on the air in Omaha, now KTGL.  The original call letters were KOAD.

By the 1950s, the owner was Mid Continent Broadcasting.  In an advertisement in the 1950 edition of Broadcasting Yearbook, KOWH said it was "The Toast of The Midwest."  It claimed a broadcast area of 215 miles in diameter, and offered advertisers "more coverage."  It said that 660 AM was a "clear channel frequency," but neglected to say that a New York City station had clear channel status on 660, while KOWH had to sign off at night.

KOWH played an important role in U.S. radio history.  In the late 1950s, the station became what many consider the first Top 40 station.  It was owned and operated by radio pioneer Todd Storz, who crafted a radio format that played the top hits every couple of hours, using high-energy disc jockeys, aimed at young listeners.  KOWH's success helped lead to Top 40 stations being established across the country.

As contemporary music listening switched to the FM band, KOWH carried a country music format, and later an urban adult contemporary format. It became a Christian radio station in September 1979, and changed its call sign to KCRO.

In 2005, the station was bought for $3.1 million by the Salem Media Group.

In July 2018, Hickory Radio agreed to purchase KCRO, co-owned talk radio station KOTK, and two translators from Salem Media. The purchase was consummated on October 31, 2018, at a price of $1.375 million.

Former logos

References

External links
Station Website

FCC History Cards for KCRO

CRO
CRO
Radio stations established in 1922
1922 establishments in Nebraska
Radio stations licensed before 1923 and still broadcasting